Elections to South Cambridgeshire District Council took place on Thursday 5 May 2011, as part of the 2011 United Kingdom local elections. Nineteen seats, making up one third of South Cambridgeshire District Council, were up for election. Seats up for election in 2011 were last contested at the 2007 election. The Conservative Party retained their majority on the council.

Summary
At this election, Conservatives were defending 11 seats, Liberal Democrats were defending six and independents were defending two seats. Two seats changed hands at this election, as the Conservatives gained both Duxford and Teversham wards from the Liberal Democrats, increasing their majority on the council. Teversham was won by the Conservatives in 2007, but had been gained by the Liberal Democrats in a 2008 by-election.

In October 2011, independent councillor Alex Riley, Longstanton, joined the Conservatives, further increasing the number of Conservative councillors to 32.

Results

Results by ward

References

2011
2011 English local elections
2010s in Cambridgeshire